Banniwala Mohra also known as Mohra Banni is a village in Punjab. It is situated to the southwest of Kallar Syedan. Kallar Syedan is a city located in Punjab, Pakistan, and is the headquarters of the Kallar Syedan Tehsil.

Banniwala Mohra is located at 33° 23' 55N 73° 20' 10E with an altitude of 514 metres (1689 feet).

References 

Union councils of Islamabad Capital Territory